Canada 98 (later Canada 99 then Canada 100 in each successive debut year) is a Canadian centennial documentary television series presented by CBC Television. The series debuted on November 25, 1964 to showcase Canada's nature. the series was hosted by J. Frank Willis featuring nine episodes (despite twelve being produced). Canada 98 was preceded by documentary film Camera Canada.

Sources
 Queen's University Directory of CBC Television Series (Canada 98 archived listing link via archive.org)

1964 Canadian television series debuts
1967 Canadian television series endings
CBC Television original programming
1960s Canadian documentary television series
Canadian Centennial